Another WolfCop is a 2017 Canadian superhero comedy film written and directed by Lowell Dean and is the sequel to the 2014 film WolfCop. It was released in theatres December 1, 2017 (Canada and the US), with a VOD release to follow in 2018. The poster was modeled on the 1986 Sylvester Stallone film Cobra.

Plot 
Lycanthrope-lawman Lou Garou continues to fight crime as WolfCop, much to the annoyance of Chief Sheriff Tina Walsh. Entrepreneur Sydney Swallows is investing in the town of Woodhaven and promises to transform the local economy with the launch of a new hockey stadium and brewery. Willie Higgins reappears and believes he was abducted and probed by aliens.

Cast

Production 
Filmed in Lumsden, Saskatchewan and Sudbury, Ontario in the early months of 2016.

Reception 
On Rotten Tomatoes the film has an approval rating of 65% based on reviews from 17 critics.
	
Noel Murray of the Los Angeles Times called it "a one-stop shop for just that kind of good-natured vulgarity" and "even grosser and wackier than its predecessor." Murray warns that the film isn't for everyone but that if you are interested in the premise of a WolfCop "you probably won't be disappointed". Trace Thurman of BloodyDisgusting.com wrote, "Another WolfCop isn't high art. It's just a fun, gory and hilarious midnight movie that will scratch your itch for camp. If you enjoyed the first WolfCop, you'll most certainly love the sequel!". The film premiered a "Ruff Cut" at Fantastic Fest (Austin, Texas) in 2016 to positive reviews. The Canadian premiere was at the Fantasia International Film Festival (Montreal, Quebec) where it won the Audience Choice Award (Gold) for best Canadian / Quebec feature film.

John Semley of the Globe and Mail gave it 1.5 out of 4 and wrote: "It may well be brain dead, dumb and intermittently a bit fun. But sometimes we need a bit more."
Simon Abrams of RogerEbert.com gave it 1.5 out of 4 and wrote: "The kind of bad movie that sounds amazing on paper, but is excruciating to watch, even at a brisk 82 minutes."

Home media 
The film earned an estimated $122,713 in DVD and Blu-ray sales.

Sequel 
The final credits promise that "WolfCop will return". Lowell Dean expressed his hopes to continue the character in some way and hoped to make a third or even fourth film.

References

External links 
 
 

Canadian sequel films
English-language Canadian films
Canadian werewolf films
Superhero horror films
2017 comedy horror films
Canadian comedy horror films
2010s English-language films
Films directed by Lowell Dean
2010s Canadian films